Nacional Futebol Clube, commonly known as Nacional de Uberaba, is a Brazilian football team based in Uberaba, Minas Gerais state.

History
The club was founded on August 1, 1944. Nacional won the Campeonato Mineiro Second Level in 1963, 1979, and in 1982.

Achievements

 Campeonato Mineiro Second Level:
 Winners (3): 1963, 1979, 1982

Stadium
Nacional Futebol Clube play their home games at Uberabão. The stadium has a maximum capacity of 25,000 people.

References

Association football clubs established in 1944
Football clubs in Minas Gerais
1944 establishments in Brazil